The Eastern Mediterranean pipeline or simply EastMed is a planned offshore/onshore natural gas pipeline, directly connecting East Mediterranean energy resources to mainland Greece via Cyprus and Crete. The project, currently in design, will transport natural gas from the off-shore gas reserves in the Levantine Basin into Greece, and in conjunction with the Poseidon and IGB pipelines into Italy and other European regions.<ref name="edison.it" The pipeline will have a length of approximately 1,900 km, reach depths of 3km, and have a capacity of 10 billion cubic meters per year. Construction of the pipeline is expected to cost approximately €6 billion (US$6.86 billion). The pipeline is being developed by IGI Poseidon S.A., a 50-50% joint venture between the Greek gas utility DEPA and the Italian gas utility Edison. 

On 2 January 2020, the EastMed Pipeline accord was signed in Athens by the leaders of Greece, Cyprus, and Israel. On 19 July 2020, the Israeli government officially approved the accord, allowing the signatory countries to move forward with plans to complete the pipeline by 2025.

However, following the withdrawal of support from the United States in January 2022, it is likely that the pipeline will be rerouted  through Egypt to bypass Cyprus.

Timeline
In 2013, the construction of the EastMed pipeline was designated under European Commission Regulation 347/2013 as a Project of Common Interest and during the 2015-2018 period the Commission contributed more than €34.5 million (US$38.9 million) to complete technical, economic and environmental studies for the project. 

The Energy Triangle of Greece, Cyprus, and Israel signed an intergovernmental agreement for the EastMed gas pipeline in Tel Aviv on 20 March 2019 in the presence of United States Secretary of State Mike Pompeo, in a sign of support from Washington for the project. American interest on the pipeline is explained by Washington's demand that its European partners maintain a diversification policy of their energy imports. The pipeline will diversify European gas supplies and lessen dependence on Russian Natural Gas.

In April 2019, the European Commission labeled the EastMed pipeline as a Project of Common Interest, having contributed €34.5 million (US$38.9 million) to complete technical studies for the project. On 7 May 2019, Italian prime minister Giuseppe Conte stated, at an event near Rome, that Italy will oppose the construction of Poseidon pipeline; the last section of EastMed connecting Greece and Italy via the Adriatic Sea, putting the entire project under consideration. However, on 1 January 2020, it was reported that the Italian Minister of Economic Development Stefano Patuanelli had sent to his Greek counterpart a letter of support for the EastMed pipeline, thus reinstating the backing of Italy for the project.

On 2 January 2020, the accord to construct the pipeline was signed in Athens by the leaders of Greece, Cyprus, and Israel. Cypriot President Nikos Anastasiadis and Israeli Prime Minister Benjamin Netanyahu characterised the accord as "historic". The accord includes provisions for ensuring the security of the pipeline and a common tax regime. The Israeli government approved the accord on 19 July 2020, allowing the project to move forward. 

In January 2022, the United States announced withdrawal of support as the project is not seen as economically viable or environmentally friendly, meaning the project is likely to be cancelled and replaced with an energy connection between Egypt and Greece. U.S. House of Representatives members, Gus Bilirakis (R-Florida) and Nicole Malliotakis (R-New York), have questioned the Biden administrations reversal on the project in view of Europe's deepening dependency on Russian gas.

Route
The pipeline will connect the Leviathan (Israel) and Aphrodite (Cyprus) gas fields in the Eastern Mediterranean to Europe. The pipeline will begin in the Levantine Basin and make landfall in Cyprus, where a compressor station will be located. From Cyprus, the pipeline will continue west for approximately 700 km, reaching depths of 3 km, and make landfall in eastern Crete. A compressor station on Crete will enable the supply of natural gas to the island. From Crete, the pipeline will continue northwest and make landfall in the eastern Peloponnese, near the village of Agios Fokas. The pipeline will cross the Peloponnese in a NW direction, cross the Gulf of Patras, and continue along western mainland Greece, ending in the Thesprotia region. From there, the proposed Poseidon pipeline will connect to Italy.

Turkey has stated that they are strongly opposed to the pipeline project, claiming to have been intentionally excluded. The final signing of the project came in a period with Turkish exploration in the area and shortly after the signing of the EEZ agreement between Turkey and Libya.

EastMed Gas Forum

In January 2019, seven energy ministers in the region penned a deal to set up the East Mediterranean Gas Forum. Total S.A., Eni and Novatek and Exxon have signed exploration and production agreements with the relevant governments. Turkey is referred to as being the exception to regional tranquility. The current members of the group are: Cyprus, Egypt, France, Greece, Israel, Italy, Jordan, and the Palestinian Authority. In January 2020, France and the United States asked to join the Forum, as a member and permanent observer respectively.

See also
 Aphrodite gas field
 Leviathan gas field
 Energy in the European Union
 Energy in Greece
 Energy in Israel
 Energy Triangle
 EuroAsia Interconnector

References

External links
 DEPA's project website

Proposed pipelines in Asia
Proposed pipelines in Europe
Natural gas pipelines in Greece
Natural gas pipelines in Israel
Pipelines under the Mediterranean Sea